The Speke Resort and Conference Centre is a hotel-resort-conference-centre in Kampala, the capital and largest city of Uganda, the third-largest economy in the East African Community. It is one of the five 4-star hotels in Kampala, as rated by the Uganda Tourism Board in June 2015.

Location
The hotel is in the neighbourhood of Munyonyo, in Makindye Division, in the southeastern part of Kampala, Uganda's capital and largest city, along the northern shores of Lake Victoria. The resort lies adjacent to the Munyonyo Commonwealth Resort. The coordinates of the hotel are 0°14'15.0"N, 32°37'30.0"E (Latitude:0.2375; Longitude:32.6250).

Overview
The resort was commissioned in 2007 in time to host the Commonwealth Heads of Government Meeting 2007. In 2012, the resort was valued at about US$150 million.

Amenities
Amenities on-site include an Olympic-size infinity swimming pool, a choice of luxury apartments, cottages, at least five restaurants, bars, an equestrian center, and a gymnasium. Accommodation consists of 335 rooms, including 55 executive suites and 59 presidential suites. Conference facilities can accommodate up to 500 guests. The marina has chauffeured and self-drive watercraft available for hire. Private yachts and boats are also accommodated. Helicopter rides for hire are also on offer. In February 2018, the hotel added 45 new suites to bring the total number of suites at the resort to 104.

Ownership
The hotel is a member of the Ruparelia Group.

See also
 Kampala Capital City Authority
 Sudhir Ruparelia

References

External links
Uganda: Speke Resort, a Bee-Hive of Activities

Hotels in Kampala
Makindye Division
Ruparelia Group
Buildings and structures in Kampala
Hotel buildings completed in 2007
Buildings and structures in Uganda
2007 establishments in Uganda